Horrem station is a station in the Kerpen district of Horrem in the German state of North Rhine-Westphalia. It is a railway junction of the Cologne–Aachen high-speed railway and the Erft Railway (Horrem–Bedburg, connecting with Neuss). The triangular station of Horrem is served by regional services and by S-Bahn trains of the Rhine-Ruhr S-Bahn. Long-distance trains run through on the high-speed line without stopping. It is classified by Deutsche Bahn as a category 3 station.

History 

The station was opened on 6 September 1841 along with the Lövenich–Aachen section of the Cologne–Aachen railway. The station building was demolished in 2012 and completely rebuilt in 2013. The new station building was built as part of a pilot project of Deutsche Bahn’s StationGreen XL-Modul program, strictly according to ecological principles and equipped with eco-friendly technology. Until 2001, Horrem station had a freight yard to its north. There are commuter parking spaces in this area. The forecourt and entrance building were fundamentally rebuilt from 2010 to 2014. A "green station" was built, with CO2-neutral operations. This involved the installation of photovoltaic and geothermal systems and the use of ecological building materials.

Station building
It has two island platform tracks for operations on the Erft Railway, which branches off from the Cologne-Aachen line at the station and four platform tracks and three through tracks for operations on the high-speed line. The station now a waiting room, a kiosk and a bookshop in the entrance building. In front of the station, there is a bus station with six platforms served by VRS bus routes towards Bergheim, Bedburg, Elsdorf, Erftstadt, Frechen, Hücheln, Hürth, Kerpen, Königshoven and Sindorf. The station forecourt and bus station were rebuilt to a different design between 2010 and 2014.

Operations

Horrem station is served by the NRW-Express (between Aachen and Hamm), the Rhein-Sieg-Express (between Aachen and Siegen) and the Erft-Bahn (between Cologne and Düsseldorf), each running hourly. It is also served by Rhine-Ruhr S-Bahn lines S13 between Sindorf or Düren and  Troisdorf and by S19 between Düren and Hennef (Sieg), Blankenberg (Sieg), Herchen or Au (Sieg). Together these provide a service every 20 minutes through Cologne on working days and every 30 minutes on the weekend. During the peak, line S12 also provides services every 20 minutes between Horrem and Hennef (Sieg).

Nord-Süd-Bahn 
On the eastern edge of Horrem is the North-South Railway (Nord-Süd-Bahn) of RWE Power (formerly Rheinbraun). Lignite and overburden are transported on this industrial railway between mines and coal-fired power stations. At the point where it crosses the railway line between Cologne and Aachen, the then longest reinforced concrete bridge in Germany built was built in 1953/54. This was necessary, because the roof of the 1623-metre long Königendorf tunnel was removed to enable its electrification and it was converted into a deep cutting. The tunnel was built in 1840 for the Belgium–Aachen–Cologne railway.

Notes

References 

  (Contributions to the History of the Erft district 5).

External links 
 
 

Railway stations in North Rhine-Westphalia
Rhine-Ruhr S-Bahn stations
S12 (Rhine-Ruhr S-Bahn)
S13 (Rhine-Ruhr S-Bahn)
Railway stations in Germany opened in 1841
Buildings and structures in Rhein-Erft-Kreis